Associação Desportiva Brusque is a women's volleyball team, based in Brusque, Santa Catarina (state), Brazil. The team was sponsored by Brazil Telecom.

2007/2008 Team

References

External links
CBV Official Page

Brazilian volleyball clubs